Chynybai Akunovich Tursunbekov (15 October 19606 July 2020) was a Kyrgyz politician.

Biography
Tursunbekov earned a degree in philology from the Kyrgyz National University in 1983, and a doctoral degree from the Kyrgyz Academy of Sciences in 1985. Following his education, Tursunbekov became an editor with the Kirghiz Soviet Socialist Republic's state publishing company. Following Kyrgyzstan's independence, he represented several of the new country's ministries abroad. With newfound economic freedom, he began pursuing an entrepreneurial career.

Tursunbekov was first elected to the Kirghiz Supreme Council in 2010 under the Social Democratic Party of Kyrgyzstan. In 2016, Supreme Council President Asylbek Jêênbekov resigned his post amidst a conflict of interest with his brother, Sooronbay, who had become Prime Minister. Tursunbekov succeeded Jêênbekov as President of the Supreme Council. However, he left the position the following year, ceding it to Dastan Jumabekov in attempt to "preserve the stability of the country". However, instability arose anyway surrounding outgoing President Almazbek Atambayev. 

On 6 July 2020, Tursunbekov was hospitalized for acute pneumonia in Bishkek. He was tested for COVID-19, which came back positive. However, his death was announced the following day, with a memorial ceremony attended by the country's political elite. Despite the negative test result, Prime Minister Kubatbek Boronov made a link between Tursunbekov's pneumonia and the coronavirus only a few hours after the announcement of his death.

References

1960 births
2020 deaths
Chairmen of the Supreme Council (Kyrgyzstan)
Social Democratic Party of Kyrgyzstan politicians
Kyrgyz National University alumni
21st-century Kyrgyzstani politicians
Deaths from pneumonia in Kyrgyzstan
Deaths from the COVID-19 pandemic in Kyrgyzstan